Jean Barthélemy Claude Toussaint Darmagnac (1 November 1766 – 12 December 1855) became a French division commander during the Napoleonic Wars. In 1791 he joined a volunteer battalion and soon became a captain. He fought with the 32nd Line Infantry Demi-Brigade against the Austrians in Italy. He participated in the French campaign in Egypt and Syria, being promoted to lead the regiment after distinguishing himself at the Battle of the Pyramids. He was badly wounded at Acre and promoted to general of brigade in 1801. Darmagnac fought at Austerlitz in 1805 and led the Paris guard in 1806–1807. Going to Spain, he was wounded at Medina de Rioseco and became a general of division in 1808. After serving as provincial governor in Old Castile, where he plundered many works of art, he assumed command of a combat division at Vitoria, the Pyrenees, the Bidassoa, the Nivelle, the Nive, Orthez, and Toulouse. After holding interior commands under the Bourbon Restoration he retired in 1831. His surname is one of the names inscribed under the Arc de Triomphe, on Column 36.

References

1766 births
1855 deaths
French generals
French military personnel of the French Revolutionary Wars
French commanders of the Napoleonic Wars
Military personnel from Toulouse
Barons of the First French Empire
Grand Officiers of the Légion d'honneur
Names inscribed under the Arc de Triomphe